Colin Evans (20 November 1936 – 23 November 1992) was a Welsh dual-code international rugby union, and professional rugby league footballer who played in the 1950s, 1960s and 1970s.

Background
Colin Evans was born in Blaenavon, Wales, he was married to Jean, he worked at Kirstall Forge, Leeds, and he died aged 56 in Leeds, West Yorkshire, England.

Playing career

International honours
Colin Evans won a cap for Wales (RU) while at Pontypool in 1960 in the 6-14 defeat by England at Twickenham Stadium on Saturday 16 January 1960, won 2 caps for Wales (RL) in 1963–1969 while at Leeds, and Keighley, and played for Rest of the World against France.

Championship final appearances
Colin Evans played , and scored a try in Leeds' 25-10 victory over Warrington in the Championship Final during the 1960–61 season at Odsal Stadium, Bradford on Saturday 20 May 1961, in front of a crowd of 52,177.

County Cup Final appearances
Colin Evans played  in Leeds' 9-19 defeat by Wakefield Trinity in the 1961 Yorkshire County Cup Final during the 1961–62 season at Odsal Stadium, Bradford on Saturday 11 November 1961.

Club career
In a "merry-go-round", in 1957 Colin Evans lost his Newport RFC scrum-half place to Brian Scrivens, and so Evans joined Pontypool RFC, where he displaced Billy Watkins, and so Watkins joined Newport RFC, where he displaced Scrivens, a similar pattern occurred for Wales, Watkins won a cap in 1959 against France, Scrivens then displaced Watkins in the Welsh trial, but joined Wigan (RL) on the verge of a cap in October 1959, Evans displaced Watkins for cap in 1960 against England. Colin Evans was transferred from York to Keighley on Wednesday 5 October 1966, he made his début for Keighley against Halifax at Thrum Hall, Halifax on Saturday 8 October 1966.

Honoured at Keighley Cougars
Colin Evans is a Keighley Cougars Hall Of Fame Inductee.

References

External links
Club History, Facts and Figures
Cougars: Gates and Evans join Hall of Fame
Profile at blackandambers.co.uk

1936 births
1992 deaths
Blaenavon RFC players
Dual-code rugby internationals
Keighley Cougars captains
Keighley Cougars players
Leeds Rhinos players
Newport RFC players
Pontypool RFC players
Rugby league halfbacks
Rugby league players from Torfaen
Rugby union players from Blaenavon
Rugby union scrum-halves
Tredegar RFC players
Wales international rugby union players
Wales national rugby league team players
Welsh rugby league players
Welsh rugby union players
York Wasps players